A chamber of rhetoric was a civic society for the promotion of poetry, drama and eloquence. They also maintained literary contact between different towns, partly through competitions in which chambers from other places were invited to compete, producing a shared literary culture across different jurisdictions. Growing from medieval confraternities that performed mystery plays and miracle plays for feast days and civic festivals, they were widespread in the Low Countries during the Renaissance period, with some survivals and revivals in subsequent periods down to the present day. They were often named after flowers or patron saints.

The following list, arranged by the town, city, liberty or lordship in which a chamber was active, is incomplete.

Aalst
 Barbaristen
 Catharinisten

Aarschot
 Tervenbloesel

Amsterdam
 Egelantier
 Wit Lavendel

Antwerp
 Goudbloem
 Olyftack
 Violieren

Arendonk
 Heilig Groetsel

Asse
 Barbaristen

Bergen op Zoom
 Jonge Vreugdebloem

Breda
 Jonge Distelbloem
 Vreugdendal

Bruges
 Drie Santinnen
 Heilige Geest

Brussels
 Den Boeck
 Corenbloem
 Lelie
 Mariacransken
 Violette

Damme
 Annunciatie

Diest
 Christusogen
 Lelie

Dunkirk
 Sint-Michiel

Enghien
 Sint-Anna

Geel
 Bremblomme

Ghent
 Balsemblomme
 Fonteine
 Sint-Agnete
 Sint-Barbara

Goes
 Nardusbloem

Gouda
 Goudbloem

Haarlem
 Trou moet Blycken
 Witte Angieren
 Wyngaertranken

Hasselt
 Roose
 de Roode Roos
 Sint-Anna

Helmond
 Vlasbloem

's-Hertogenbosch
 Barbaristen
 Catharinisten
 Jonge Lauwerieren
 Moyses bosch
 Passiebloem
 Sint-Agatha

Hoboken
 Leliken van Calvarien

Leiden
 Oranjelelie

Leffinge
 Altoos Doende

Lier
 Jenettebloem

Leuven
 Lelie
 Peterseliepoot
 Roose

Maastricht
 Jonge Goudbloem

Mechelen
 Lisbloem
 Peoene

Mol
 Lindebloem

Mons
 réthoriciens de Notre-Dame

Nieuwpoort
 Doornenkroon

Ninove
 Witte Waterroose

Oudenaarde
 Jonge Retorike
 Pax vobis

Tienen
 Fonteine

Tongeren
 Witte Lelie

Tournai
 Puy d'amours

Turnhout
 Heybloemken

Valenciennes
 Notre Dame du Puy

Vilvoorde
 Goudbloem

Ypres
 Achtervroets
 Getrouw van herten
 Lichtgeladen
 Morianen
 Roziers
 Vreugdenaars

Zoutleeuw
 Lelikens uten Dale

Sources
 Prudens van Duyse, De rederijkkamers in Nederland, 2 vols. (Ghent, 1900–1902)
 A. A. Keersmaekers, Geschiedenis van de Antwerpse Rederijkerskamers in de jaren 1585–1635 (Aalst, 1952)
 Jan Thieullier, ed., De schadt-kiste der philosophen ende poeten waer inne te vinden syn veel schoone leerlycke blasoenen, refereynen ende liedekens gebracht ende gesonden op de Peoen-camere binnen Mechelen (Mechelen, Henry Jaye, 1621)
 Anne-Laure Van Bruaene, Het Repertorium van rederijkerskamers in de Zuidelijke Nederlanden en Luik 1400-1650 (online publication, 2004)

Poetry-related lists
Theatre-related lists
Chamber of rhetoric